Zaretis itys, the skeletonized leafwing or leaf wing butterfly, is a Neotropical nymphalid butterfly genus in the subfamily Charaxinae.

Subspecies
Zaretis itys itys - Surinam 
Zaretis itys itylus (Westwood, 1850) - Brazil (Rio de Janeiro, Espírito Santo)

Description
The upperside of both wings is dull orange. The underside of the wings simulates dried leaves in colour and pattern. The ground colour is usually earthy brown.

Biology
Caterpillars feed on leaves of Casearia and Laetia species (Salicaceae). They usually bind their droppings together with silk as protection from ants.

Distribution
This species can be found from Mexico to the Guyanas, Paraguay, Suriname and Brazil.

Bibliography
Muyshondt, 1973 - Notes on the life cycle and natural history of butterflies of El Salvador. II. Anaea (Zaretis) itys J. Lep. Soc. 27: 294-302
Carlos Guilherme C. MielkeI; Olaf H. H. MielkeII; Mirna M. Casagrande Comparative study of the external morphology of Zaretis itys itylus (Westwood) and Agrias claudina annetta (Gray)

References

External links
 Neotropical Butterflies

Anaeini
Nymphalidae of South America
Butterflies described in 1777
Taxa named by Pieter Cramer